The management by wandering around (MBWA), also management by walking around, refers to a style of business management which involves managers wandering around, in an unstructured manner, through the workplace(s), at random, to check with employees, equipment, or on the status of ongoing work. The emphasis is on the word wandering as an unplanned movement within a workplace, rather than a plan where employees expect a visit from managers at more systematic, pre-approved or scheduled times. 

The expected benefit is that a manager, by random sampling of events or employee discussions, is more likely to facilitate improvements to the morale, sense of organizational purpose, productivity and total quality management of the organization, as compared to remaining in a specific office area and waiting for employees, or the delivery of status reports, to arrive there, as events warrant in the workplace.

Similarities

"Management by wandering around" is very similar to the Japanese gemba walk method developed at Toyota.

History 
The origin of the term has been traced to executives at the company Hewlett-Packard for management practices in the 1970s. However, the general concept of managers making spontaneous visits to employees in the workplace has been a common practice in some other companies as well. Also, the management consultants Tom Peters and Robert H. Waterman had used the term in their 1982 book In Search of Excellence: Lessons from America's Best-Run Companies.

See also 
 W. Edwards Deming
 Total quality management

References

Further reading
 

Quality management
Business terms
Walking